Ruoergai County or Zoigê County is a county of Ngawa Tibetan and Qiang Autonomous Prefecture in Sichuan, China, bordering Gansu to the north. It is the northernmost county of the province. It is part of the Tibetan traditional region of Amdo.

Geography
Ruoergai County is found in the easternmost sections of the Tibetan Plateau.  The county is primarily a highland basin made up of the Ruoergai Marsh between the Min Mountains and Amne Machin. The western border of the county, shared with Maqu County in Gansu, is formed by the first major bend of the Yellow River where it changes course nearly 180 degrees and heads back towards Qinghai.

Climate 
Ruoergai has an alpine subarctic climate (Köppen Dwc), featuring very cold nights even in summertime, and very cold winters with extreme diurnal temperature ranges. Snow can fall any time of the year and usually does not melt until summer due to repeated nightly freezing even when maxima are above . Therefore, access to Ruoergai is heavily restricted during the winter months from late October to early May. Sitting at an altitude of more than 11,000 feet, high-altitude sickness is another common problem for tourists.

Transport
China National Highway 213

Administrative divisions
Ruoergai County has four towns and 13 townships:
Town: 
Dazhasi
Tangke
Xiaman
Hongxing
Townships:
Banyou
Axi
Maixi
Nenwa
Donglie
Chong'er
Re'er
Zhanwa
Jiangzha
Baxi
Axirong
Qiuji
Baozuo

References
 "China Ruoergai" - County Government site

County-level divisions of Sichuan
Ngawa Tibetan and Qiang Autonomous Prefecture